The 2010 PDC Pro Tour was a series of non-televised darts tournaments organised by the Professional Darts Corporation (PDC). They were Professional Dart Players Association (PDPA) Players Championships and UK Open Qualifiers.  This year there were 45 PDC Pro Tour events – 37 Players Championships and 8 UK Open Qualifiers.

Prize money
Prize money for each Players Championship (excluding Australia and Canada) and UK Open Qualifier increased from £29,600 in 2009 to £31,200 in 2010. Prize money for Australian and Canadian Players Championships remained unchanged at £21,600 per event.

In addition, £400 per Pro Tour event was reserved for a nine-dart finish. Should this not be won in an event, it would be carried over to the next event, and so on until a nine-dart finish is achieved. Once the prize fund is won, it reverted to £400 for the next event.

Players Championships
(All matches – best of 11 legs)

Eddie Cox Memorial Players Championship 1 at the Tercentenary Sports Hall, Gibraltar on February 6

PDPA Players Championship 2 Gibraltar at the Tercentenary Sports Hall, Gibraltar on February 7

PDPA Players Championship 3 Swindon at Oasis Leisure Centre, Swindon on February 20

PDPA Players Championship 4 Derby at the Moorways Centre, Derby on February 27

PDPA Players Championship 5 Germany at van der Valk Hotel, Gladbeck on March 6

PDPA Players Championship 6 Germany at van der Valk Hotel, Gladbeck on March 7

PDPA Players Championship 7 Wigan at the Robin Park Tennis Centre, Wigan on March 13

PDPA Players Championship 8 Crawley at the K2 Centre, Crawley on March 20

Bobby Bourn Memorial Players Championship 9 at the Metrodome, Barnsley on April 10

PDPA Players Championship 10 Derby at the Moorways Centre, Derby on April 17

PDPA Players Championship 11 Wigan at the Robin Park Tennis Centre, Wigan on April 24

PDPA Players Championship 12 Wigan at the Robin Park Tennis Centre, Wigan on May 8

PDPA Players Championship 13 Austria at the Renaissance Hotel, Salzburg on May 15

PDPA Players Championship 14 Austria at the Renaissance Hotel, Salzburg on May 16

PDPA Players Championship 15 Barnsley at the Metrodome, Barnsley on June 12

PDPA Players Championship 16 Barnsley at the Metrodome, Barnsley on June 13

PDPA Players Championship 17 Holland at the Van Der Valk Hotel, Haarlem on June 19

PDPA Players Championship 18 Holland at the Van Der Valk Hotel, Haarlem on June 20

US Open Players Championship 19 at the Tropicana Hotel, Las Vegas, Nevada on June 27

Players Championship 20 Las Vegas at the Tropicana Hotel, Las Vegas, Nevada on June 28

Players Championship 21 Las Vegas at the Tropicana Hotel, Las Vegas, Nevada on June 29

Australian Open Players Championship 22 at the Revesby Workers Club, Sydney on August 22

Canadian Players Championship 23 at the Hilton, London, Ontario on August 28

Canadian Masters Players Championships 24 at the Hilton, London, Ontario on August 29

PDPA Players Championship 25 Crawley at the K2 Centre, Crawley on September 4

PDPA Players Championship 26 Crawley at the K2 Centre, Crawley on September 5

PDPA Players Championship 27 Holland in Nuland on September 18

PDPA Players Championship 28 Holland in Nuland on September 19

PDPA Players Championship 29 Ireland at the Citywest Hotel, Dublin on October 2

PDPA Players Championship 30 Ireland at the Citywest Hotel, Dublin on October 3

John McEvoy Gold Dart Classic Players Championship 31 at the National Event Centre, Killarney on October 17

PDPA Players Championship 32 Bad Nauheim at the Dolce Bad Nauheim on October 23

PDPA Players Championship 33 Bad Nauheim at the Dolce Bad Nauheim on October 24

PDPA Players Championship 34 Barnsley at the Metrodome, Barnsley on November 6

PDPA Players Championship 35 Barnsley at the Metrodome, Barnsley on November 7

PDPA Players Championship 36 Derby at the Moorways Centre, Derby on November 26

PDPA Players Championship 37 Derby at the Moorways Centre, Derby on November 27

UK Open Qualifiers

Australian Grand Prix Pro Tour

The Australian Grand Prix rankings are calculated from events across Australia. The top player in the rankings automatically qualifies for the 2011 World Championship.

Other PDC tournaments
The PDC also held a number of other tournaments during 2010. These were mainly smaller events with low prize money, and some had eligibility restrictions. All of these tournaments were non-ranking.

References

External links
2010 PDC Calendar

PDC Pro Tour
PDC Pro Tour